Gornje Livade is a small geographical area in south-eastern Banat, Serbia. It is situated in eastern part of Deliblatska Peščara.

Geographical regions of Serbia
Geography of Vojvodina
Banat